Beves of Hamtoun, also known as Beves of Hampton, Bevis of Hampton or Sir Beues of Hamtoun, is an anonymous Middle English romance of 4620 lines, dating from around the year 1300, which relates the adventures of the English hero Beves in his own country and in the Near East.  It is often classified as a Matter of England romance. It is a paraphrase or loose translation of the Anglo-Norman romance Boeuve de Haumton, and belongs to a large family of romances in many languages, including Welsh, Russian and even Yiddish versions, all dealing with the same hero.

For centuries Beves of Hamtoun was one of the most popular verse romances in the English language, and the only one that never had to be rediscovered, since it has been circulated and read continuously from the Middle Ages down to modern times, in its original form, in prose adaptations, and in scholarly editions. It exercised an influence on, among others, Chaucer, Spenser, Shakespeare and Bunyan.

Synopsis 

Beves's father, the aged nobleman Guy of Hampton, is murdered by his mother and her lover, the Emperor of Germany. The guilty pair marry, and are soon plotting to kill Beves, the seven-year-old heir to Guy's earldom. When the plot fails they instead sell him to merchants, who send him off to the Levant by ship. There he finds refuge at the court of Ermin, king of Armenia. 

As he grows up he proves his valour in various exploits, the king's daughter Josian falls in love with him, and the king makes Beves a knight and presents him with a sword called Morgelai and a horse called Arondel. Beves repels an invasion by the Saracen king Brademond, but falls out with Josian, whom he finds too independent-minded. The two are reconciled when Josian declares she will be a Christian. 

A guard loyal to Brademond sees Josian and Bevus kiss, the guard then lies to Ermin that Beves had slept with Josian. Ermin, believing that Beves has deflowered his daughter, sends Beves to Brademond with a sealed letter in which Brademond is asked to kill him. Ermin tells Beves he should not take his horse, nor his sword, as they do not befit a messenger. Beves reaches Damascus, insults the Saracen gods, and presents his letter to Brademond, who immediately casts Beves into a deep pit.

Seven years later Beves succeeds in escaping from the pit and rides off. Beves stops by at Jerusalem and  confesses to the patriarch, who then forbids Beves to take a wife, unless she is a virgin. After many adventures he reaches the court of king Ermin and discovers that Josian has been married off to another man, king Yvor.  

Beves disguises himself as a poor pilgrim so as to be able to gain admittance to Josian. Disguised, Beves asks Josian to show him his old horse, Arondel, who has not allowed any rider on him but Beves. Arondel recognises Beves, and then so does Josian. Beves, mindful of what the patriarch told him, tells Josian he cannot be with her as she has had a husband for the past seven years. Josian claims that though married she is still a virgin, and urges him to remember their love.  They escape from the court pursued by a giant called Ascopard, Ascopard is felled by Beves but is spared through Josian's plea.  The three discover a ship, kill its Saracen crew, and sail off to the West.

In Cologne they meet a bishop who baptises Josian. Ascopard avoids being christened claiming he is too big. Beves fights and kills a poisonous dragon, and then sails to England to back claim his earldom, leaving Josian behind for the time being. In Beves's absence Josian is forced to marry a secret admirer of hers, but she kills him on their wedding night. She is condemned to death for this crime, but is rescued by Beves and Ascopard, and the three make their escape to the Isle of Wight. Beves defeats his stepfather the emperor in battle, and kills him by dropping him into a kettle of molten lead. Beves and Josian are married.

Beves now falls out with the English king Edgar, and in consequence goes back to Armenia with his pregnant wife Josian and Ascopard. Ascopard turns against Beves and, having secretly conspired with king Yvor, abducts Josian, leaving her newly born twin sons Miles and Guy behind.  Beves fosters his sons out to a fisherman and a forester, then goes in search of Josian. Meanwhile, Saber, guided by a dream, follows Beves, discovers Josian and rescues her. Together they discover Beves and the children. 

Beves rejoins the Armenian king Ermin and aids him in a war against king Yvor. Ermin dies, having made Beves's son Guy his heir. Beves fights one more war against Yvor, defeats him, and takes his place as king of Mombraunt. The family return to England and fight a successful war with king Edgar, which ends with Edgar offering Miles his only daughter in marriage. Once more Beves, Josian and Guy journey eastward and take up their two kingdoms. After twenty years Beves and Josian die together in each other's arms.

Manuscripts 

Beves exists in an unusually large number of manuscripts and early printed editions, demonstrating the enormous popularity of the romance. The surviving manuscripts are:A: Edinburgh, NLS MS Advocates' 19.2.1 (Auchinleck MS). Date 1330-1340. Reproduced in The Auchinleck Manuscript: National Library of Scotland Advocates’ MS 19.2.1, introduction by Derek Pearsall and I. C. Cunningham (London: Scolar Press, 1971); and in The Auchinleck Manuscript ed. David Burnley and Alison Wiggins, at http://www.nls.uk/auchinleck.

S: London, British Library MS. Egerton 2862 (Sutherland MS./Trentham MS.). Date late fourteenth century or fifteenth century.

N: Naples, Biblioteca Nazionale MS. XIII.B.29. Date 1450s.

E: Cambridge, Gonville and Caius College MS. 175/96. Date 1450-1475.  Contains only about a third of Beves.

T: Cambridge, Trinity College MS. O.2.13. Date mid- to late fifteenth century.  A fragment containing 245 lines of Beves.

B: Oxford, Bodleian MS. Eng. Poet. D.208. Date mid- to late fifteenth century. Two short fragments.

M: Manchester, Chetham's Library MS. 8009.  Date c. 1470–1480.

C: Cambridge, Cambridge University Library MS. Ff.2.38.  Date late fifteenth or early sixteenth century. Reproduced in Cambridge University Library MS. Ff.2.38, introd. by Frances McSparran and P. R. Robinson (London: Scolar Press, 1979).

The manuscripts and printed editions show the story in at least four appreciably different versions, represented by A, by C, by S and N, and lastly by the early printed editions. None of them is clearly closer to the lost original Middle English version than the others. This complicated textual transmission makes the editing of Beves notoriously difficult.

Early editions 

Beves was printed at least six times between c. 1500 and c. 1533; one of these editions was the work of Richard Pynson, two probably of Julian Notary, and three probably of Wynkyn de Worde; none have survived in a complete form. William Copland's edition, dating from c. 1560, is the earliest one of which a complete copy is known. 

Ten more editions are known from the years c. 1565 to 1667, and an eleventh one was published in Aberdeen c. 1711. In the early 16th century Beves was only one of many popular romances, so that William Tyndale could complain of the flood of such works: "Robin Hood and Bevis of Hampton, Hercules, Hector and Troilus with a thousand histories and fables of love and wantonness". But the continued popularity of the verse Beves in the later Elizabethan and early Stuart period is very unusual; indeed, no other Middle English romance continued to be published in verse form after the 1570s, their place having been taken by translations of Spanish romances.

Various prose versions were published during the late 17th century and early 18th century in chapbook form. They follow the plot of the poem reasonably closely, though some, such as The Famous and Renowned History of Sir Bevis of Southampton (1689), also add new episodes and characters. Such books were often read by the common people, including such children as the one described by the 18th century essayist Richard Steele: "He would tell you the mismanagement of John Hickerthrift, find fault with the passionate temper in Bevis of Southampton, and loved St. George for being the champion of England; and by this means had his thoughts insensibly moulded into the notions of discretion, virtue, and honour."  After the mid 18th century interest in Beves began to decline, and the printer of a 1775 reprint says the story is "very little known".

Verse form 

Beves is mainly written in rhyming couplets, but the opening section is in tail rhyme. In A, E and C the first 474 lines are mainly in six-line tail-rhyme stanzas, rhyming aa4b2cc4b2, occasionally varied with twelve-line stanzas, aa4b2cc4b2dd4b2ee4b2, and six-line stanzas, aa4b2aa4b2. In S and N the tail-rhyme is continued until line 528, mostly by a simple process of adding tail-lines to the existing couplets. No earlier tail-rhyme romance in Middle English is known.

Influence 

A version of Beves probably related to C or M was the direct source of an Early Modern Irish romance, untitled in the sole surviving manuscript but now sometimes called Bibus.  Bibus is shorter than its Middle English counterpart, and is written in prose.  

Chaucer refers to Beves and other poems as "romances of prys" in his tale of Sir Thopas (VII.897–900), and there are also some verbal similarities between the two works.  Spenser uses themes from Beves, especially the dragon-fight, in the adventures of his Redcrosse Knight in Book 1 of The Faerie Queene. 

The Beves dragon-fight was also used as the template for Richard Johnson's version of the story of St. George and the dragon, in his immensely popular romance The Famous Historie of the Seaven Champions of Christendom (1596–97).  

Shakespeare's lines in Henry VIII, Act I, scene 1, "that former fabulous story/Being now seen possible enough, got credit,/That Bevis was believed", show his knowledge of the romance. In King Lear Act III, scene iv, Edgar's lines "But mice and rats, and such small deer,/Have been Tom’s food for seven long year" are taken from Beves’s "Rattes and myce and suche smal dere/Was his mete that seven yere". Similar references to Beves and Ascapart are common in the works of Ben Jonson, Henry Vaughan and other Elizabethan and Jacobean poets and playwrights. Michael Drayton retold the story of Beves in his Poly-Olbion, Second Song. 

John Bunyan's A Few Sighs from Hell records that in his unregenerate youth he had been more fond of secular works than of the Bible: "Alas, what is the Scripture, give me a Ballad, a Newsbook, George on horseback, or Bevis of Southhampton". Some plot-elements of the romance have been traced in The Pilgrim's Progress. In 1801 the young Walter Scott, alluding to Chaucer's description, told his friend George Ellis that it was perhaps "the dullest Romance of priis which I ever attempted to peruse." Nevertheless, in Scott's later works his characters repeatedly cite Beves as the type of the perfect chivalric hero.

Daniel Defoe, travelling through Hampshire, found that the influence of the poem was exercised on folklore as well as literature. He noted that "Whatever the fable of Bevis of Southampton, and the gyants in the woods thereabouts may be deriv'd from, I found the people mighty willing to have those things pass for true." A prehistoric barrow above Compton, near the West Sussex/Hampshire border, is sometimes called Bevis's Thumb.  Two more barrows, one near Havant and another near Arundel Castle, bear the name Bevis's Grave.  Arundel Castle was, in the 17th century, supposed to have been founded by Bevis, and it still exhibits a sword 1.75 metres long said to have been his wonderful sword Morgelai, or Morglay. Until the 19th century the parish church of Bosham could show a huge pole which had been used by Bevis as a staff when wading across an inlet of the sea there.

Beves of Hamtoun also made its mark on the English language. It is the earliest known source of the proverb "many hands make light work", and of another once popular proverb, "save a thief from the gallows and he will never love you". The word Morglay, entered the language during the late 16th and early 17th centuries as a common noun meaning "sword". It was used in that sense by, for example, Richard Stanihurst in his translation of the Aeneid, by Fletcher, Massinger and Field in The Honest Man's Fortune, and by John Cleveland in The Character of a London Diurnall.

Early scholarship 

The romance of Beves began to attract scholarly as well as popular attention with the revival of interest in vernacular medieval literature in the mid-18th century. In his Observations on the Faery Queen of Spenser (1754, revised 1762) Thomas Warton demonstrated Spenser's debt to Beves, while his friend Thomas Percy discovered the influence of Beves on King Lear and The Seven Champions of Christendom, and in his Reliques of Ancient English Poetry identified A, C and E as manuscripts that contained versions of Beves. 

Thomas Tyrwhitt, in a 1775 edition of The Canterbury Tales, correctly identified Beves’s source as a romance written in England, perhaps by an Englishman, in some form of French.  In 1805 the historian and satirist George Ellis included a lengthy abstract of Beves, based on E and on Pynson's edition, in his Specimens of Early English Metrical Romances.  In a letter to Walter Scott he raised the possibility, now widely accepted, that Chaucer had read Beves in A. In the winter of 1831–32 Sir Walter Scott discovered N in the Royal Library of Naples, and commissioned a copy of it which he brought back to Scotland. 

In 1838 the young antiquary William Barclay Turnbull edited Beves for the Maitland Club, taking A as his base text. This first attempt at a scholarly edition had no notes or glossary, and was criticised for inaccuracy, but it remained the only one until the German philologist Eugen Kölbing edited A, giving variants from other manuscripts in footnotes.

Critical reception 

Few critics of Beves of Hampton have shared Eugen Kölbing's opinion that, "The strain in which this work is written, is serious, even severe". More recently Derek Pearsall was one of those who took the diametrically opposite view: "Beves of Hamtoun makes every possible concession to popular taste. The story is a heady brew of outrageous incident... the whole fantastic pot-pourri is carried off with irresistible panache and a marked sense of the comic. It is vivid, gross and ridiculous by turns, but never dull." Again, it has been said that "Bevis of Hampton is not a remarkable example of medieval romance. It is made up of stock motifs and episodes... the articulation of the episodes is loose and inexpert. What gives the romance its chief distinction is its exuberance, its racy, buoyant style, and the spirit of broad humor in which it is written."  Dieter Mehl called it "extremely lively and entertaining, though on the whole rather artless".   In other words, the poem is often treated as an example of what G. K. Chesterton and George Orwell called the "good bad book", having the characteristics that make for readability and popular success rather than high literary quality. 

W. R. J. Barron was not enthusiastic about works of this kind: "The English versions of Bevis and Guy are competent but somewhat vulgarized, given to the reduplication of striking effects, paying lip-service to the heroes' values while almost wholly preoccupied by their adventures". Other critics have found themselves enjoying Beves almost in spite of themselves. 

George Kane wrote that it "has a better effect than its component material would seem to warrant, for this almost formless story, with its miracles and marvels, ranting Saracens and dragons, is told without any polish or skill in a style generously padded and tagged, with little sense of poetic or narrative art, and still the romance is more than merely readable. As with Horn and Havelok we tolerate its artistic crudity for the sake of the company of the hero and heroine, Beues and Iosiane, who reflect the warm humanity of the imagination that created them." The romance's most recent editors considered that "If the values of the hero are not particularly deep, they are nonetheless heartfelt, and expressed with admirable verve. And we should be reluctant to underestimate the value of a good adventure story or the difficulty of producing one. Its energy and its variety, perhaps more than anything, are what enable modern readers to understand its earlier popularity and also to respond to it in the present."

Modern editions 

 W. B. D. D. Turnbull (ed.), Sir Beves of Hamtoun: A Metrical Romance.  Edinburgh: Maitland Club, 1838.
 E. Kölbing (ed.), The Romance of Sir Beues of Hamtoun.  Early English Text Society, Extra Series 46, 48, 65.  London: Trübner, 1885, 1886, 1894.
 J. Fellows, "Bevis of Hampton: Study and Edition".  Unpublished Ph.D. dissertation, University of Cambridge, 1979.
 R. B. Herzman, G. Drake and E. Salisbury (eds.), Four Romances of England.  Kalamazoo, Michigan: Western Michigan University for TEAMS, 1999.

Notes

References

External links 
 The TEAMS edition of Beves
 Introduction to the TEAMS edition
 Beves at the Database of Middle English Romance
 Bibliography of editions and studies of Beves
 "Versification and translation in Sir Beves of Hampton" by Ivana Djordjević

Romance (genre)
Middle English poems
13th-century poems
14th-century poems
Works of unknown authorship
Bevis of Hampton
13th century in England
14th century in England
Islam in fiction